Paul Ballard (born May 17, 1983 in New Westminster, British Columbia) is a Canadian soccer coach. He is currently the head coach of the women's soccer program at Bishop's University. His coaching career followed a five-year run as a professional soccer player internationally. Since retiring from his professional/semi-professional career, Paul has developed a passion for coaching and mentoring athletes through transformational servant leadership.

Career

Ballard received his, UEFA A coaching license from IFA in 2018. He is currently the director of soccer at Bishop's University and the head coach of the varsity women's soccer team.

Ballard started his coaching career in Langley with the Langley United Soccer Association, where he was awarded the Fraser Valley coach of the year. He was also an assistant coach with the Trinity Western Men's soccer team from 2012 to 2016.

University
Ballard played college soccer at Trinity Western, where he was a four-time Canada West Conference First Team All-Star, a two-time All-Canadian in 2005 and 2006, and the Trinity Western University Athlete of the Year in both 2005 and 2006. He graduated with an undergrad degree in 2006. He completed his master's degree in leadership in 2017 at Trinity Western University.

Professional
Ballard began his professional career playing in Vancouver Whitecaps developmental program, with Vancouver Whitecaps Residency in the Pacific Coast Soccer League.

After spending the 2008 season playing in South Africa with F.C. AK in the National First Division, Ballard joined the Cleveland City Stars of the USL First Division on April 20, 2009. He played 15 games for Cleveland before being released at the end of the season when the club folded.

Having been unable to secure a professional contract elsewhere, Ballard signed to play for Abbotsford Mariners in the USL Premier Development League in 2010.

From 2010 to 2012, Paul played in the NIFL Championship 1 in Northern Ireland with H&W Welders and Dundela FC. Due to multiple serious knee injuries, Paul retired from professional soccer at the end of the 2012 season.

Honors and awards
Terry Fox Secondary Wall of Fame 2009
Trinity Western Men's Soccer Wall of Fame 2016.

Personal

References

External links
 Cleveland City Stars bio
 Canada West All Star
 Ballard earns UEFA A License

1983 births
Living people
Canadian soccer players
Canadian expatriate soccer players
Vancouver Whitecaps Residency players
Cleveland City Stars players
Fraser Valley Mariners players
USL League Two players
USL First Division players
Expatriate soccer players in South Africa
Canadian expatriates in South Africa
Sportspeople from New Westminster
Soccer people from British Columbia
F.C. AK players
Association football defenders